Oum El Abouab also known as Seressi is a town in Zaghouan Governorate, Tunisia that is located at 36° 10′ 00″ N, 9° 46′ 20″E. It is at an altitude of 2000m.  
During the Roman Empire, Henchir-Oum-el-Abouab was known as Seressi and was a municipium (city) of the Roman Province of Africa Proconsularis and flourished from 30BC to 640AD. Ruins at Oum El Abouab include a forum, unidentified public buildings, a theater and an amphitheater.

The town was the site of a World War II battle during the Tunisia Campaign.

References

Cities in Tunisia
Catholic titular sees in Africa
Former Roman Catholic dioceses in Africa
Roman towns and cities in Africa (Roman province)